Chitala hypselonotus is a species of knifefish found in freshwater habitats in Borneo and Sumatra in southeast Asia.

References

Notopteridae
Freshwater fish of Indonesia
Fish described in 1852